The Cricketer is a monthly English cricket magazine providing writing and photography from international, county and club cricket.

Overview
The magazine was founded in 1921 by Sir Pelham Warner, an ex-England captain turned cricket writer. Warner edited the magazine until 1963. Later editors included E. W. Swanton, Christopher Martin-Jenkins and Simon Hughes.

Apart from its coverage of the contemporary game, The Cricketer has also contributed to the sport's history.  For example, its researchers uncovered a letter in The Weekly Journal dated 21 July 1722, which is our source for an early fixture in Islington between London and Dartford on 18 July 1722.

The magazine is responsible for the National Village Cup, an annual competition between village cricket sides, with the final played at Lord's. It also runs the Cricketer Cup competition for old boys' teams from the public schools, which began with 16 teams in 1967 and has since expanded.

After surviving for over 80 years as an independent publication, the magazine was purchased by Wisden, which merged it in 2003 with Wisden Cricket Monthly. A new magazine called The Wisden Cricketer enjoyed some success under the editorship of John Stern over the next eight years. In December 2010, a private equity company called Test Match Extra Ltd – which owned and ran a cricket website of the same name – bought the magazine from the then owners BSkyB. In May 2011, the magazine dropped 'Wisden' from the masthead and became The Cricketer (in association with Wisden). Stern left as editor later that month.

Andrew Miller joined as editor in January 2012, with former Nottinghamshire cricketer Andy Afford appointed as publishing director. Afford soon took on the role of managing director and when Miller, departed Simon Hughes, a former Middlesex and Durham bowler, became the title's editor-at-large from 1 September 2014. Supporting the appointment of Hughes, Alec Swann joined as Head of Editorial Planning and Production after four-and-a-half years with the Northamptonshire Evening Telegraph. However, when Hughes became the magazine's full editor with effect from the April 2016 edition, Swann was no longer involved with the publication.  As of 2021, Huw Turbervill is the editor of the magazine.

The Cricketer is the world best-selling cricket title, with an ABC-audited circulation of 22,000. It is available in digital format for mobile and tablet devices via iTunes, Google Play and Amazon.com publishing platforms.

The Cricketer Publishing Limited owns The Cricketer, along with other assets that include CricketArchive, The National Village Cup, Thecricketer.com and TestMatchSofa.com.

References

External links

History of The Cricketer by Tim Brocklehurst, Cricinfo

Monthly magazines published in the United Kingdom
Sports magazines published in the United Kingdom
Cricket magazines
Magazines published in London
Magazines established in 1921
Cricket collectibles